The Burgenlandbahn is a brand that DB Regio uses for their local passenger rail transport in southern Saxony-Anhalt, Germany. Since 1999, it has served several branch lines, some of them have been canceled in the meantime. With the Burgenlandbahn great hopes were combined to secure the area network by low operating costs despite low population density permanently.

The train company currently serves 32 stations in a traffic area of 2,200 square kilometers and 500,000 inhabitants and a network of around 100 kilometers. Annually around 1.15 million train kilometers are provided.

Rolling stock

19x DWA LVT/S (VT 672)

Network

Current services

Former services

References

External links
 

Railway companies of Germany
Railway companies established in 2002
Companies based in Saxony
Companies based in Leipzig
Transport in Saxony-Anhalt
Transport in Thuringia
Burgenlandkreis
Deutsche Bahn